Wianka van Dorp (born 1 December 1987) is a Dutch rower. Competing as the bow in different events she won a bronze medal at the 2011 World Championships and three silver medals at the European championships in 2013–2016. She finished sixth in the eight at the 2016 Rio Olympics.

Van dorp took up rowing in 2004. She has degrees in management and the marketing supply chain from Open University in the Netherlands and in management and sports marketing from Rotterdam University of Applied Sciences.

References

External links

 

1987 births
Living people
Dutch female rowers
Olympic rowers of the Netherlands
Rowers at the 2016 Summer Olympics
People from Vlaardingen
World Rowing Championships medalists for the Netherlands
European Rowing Championships medalists
Sportspeople from South Holland
21st-century Dutch women
20th-century Dutch women